Dendropsophus bogerti is a species of frog in the family Hylidae. It is endemic to the Andes of Colombia and occurs in the Cordillera Central in Antioquia, Caldas, and Chocó Departments. The specific name bogerti honors Charles Mitchill Bogert, an American herpetologist. Soon after its description in 1970, it was relegated to synonymy of Dendropsophus carnifex, but its species status was restored in 1997.

Description
In a sample from Chocó, three adult males measure  and an adult female measures  in snout–vent length (SVL). The snout is short and rounded. The tympanum is very indistinct. The fingers are webbed at the base, whereas the toes are slightly more than one-half webbed. Coloration is sexually dimorphic: males have dull yellowish green dorsal surfaces of body and limbs, while these are pale golden brown or beige in females. The concealed surfaces of the limbs are bright orange. The throat bright yellow and the belly and posteroventral part of flanks are pale brownish yellow. The iris is coppery. 

The tadpoles have an ovoid body that is wider than it is tall. Body coloration is dark brown with blue, gold, and purple iridescence anteriorly and with golden spots on dorsally. The fins are coppery brown. The tail is xiphicercal (i.e., narrowing abruptly to a distinct flagellum). Tadpoles of Gosner stage 34 measure  in body length, or about 41% of the total length.

Habitat and conservation
The eggs are deposited in temporary or permanent pools. This very common species is not facing any known threats. Nevertheless, it has not been recorded in protected areas.

References

bogerti
Amphibians of the Andes
Amphibians of Colombia
Endemic fauna of Colombia
Taxa named by Doris Mable Cochran
Amphibians described in 1970
Taxonomy articles created by Polbot